Tetiana Mykolaïvna Kolesnikova (born 9 August 1977 in Mykolaiv) is a Ukrainian rower. At the 2004 Olympics she was disqualified with her team after one of her teammates, Olena Olefirenko, tested positive for ethamivan.

References 
 
 

1977 births
Living people
Ukrainian female rowers
Sportspeople from Mykolaiv
Olympic rowers of Ukraine
Rowers at the 2004 Summer Olympics
Rowers at the 2008 Summer Olympics
Competitors stripped of Summer Olympics medals
World Rowing Championships medalists for Ukraine
European Rowing Championships medalists
21st-century Ukrainian women